Carkeek Park is a  park located in the Broadview neighborhood of Seattle, Washington.  The park contains Piper Orchard, Pipers Creek (and its tributaries Venema Creek and Mohlendorph Creek), play and picnic areas, picnic shelters, and hiking trails. A pedestrian bridge across the main lines of the BNSF Railway connects to the Carkeek Park sand beach on Puget Sound. Park program activities are largely out of the Carkeek Park Environmental Learning Center.

History 
Seattle's first park to be called "Carkeek Park" was on Pontiac Bay, Lake Washington (1918–1926), now site of Magnuson Park.  The original was a gift of Mr. and Mrs. Morgan J. Carkeek, prominent builder and contractor in Seattle, Oregon, and Victoria, B.C.  The original was displaced by a Naval Air Station.  Morgan Carkeek offered the proceeds of his sale to the City for another park. The new park was to be at the mouth of a creek at a location named kʷaatəb in Lushootseed, translated at "place where people are sent".

Most of the existing site was purchased by the City of Seattle in the later 1920s, with 20% donated by Carkeek, following citizen petition over vigorous City opposition.  The park went through a few themes over years, from outdoor performance venue, to farm for zoo animal feed, to pasturage rental, to park with WPA Civilian Conservation Corps construction (1933-–36, removed in 1938), to U.S. Army camp (just in 1942), to sewage treatment plant (over vigorous opposition by neighborhoods groups).  Bond funds in the late 1940s allowed reconstruction of park facilities, including a planned large equestrian academy and concession to reduce chronic rowdyism in the park, but a tight city budget in spite of generous donations forced indefinite postponement.  An archery field was built (c. 1955), and closed when it was moved to Magnuson Park in August 1985.  Treated sewage outfall ended in the early 1960s with closure of the treatment plant and replacement with a Metro sewage pumping station near the parking lot for the beach.

Additional property was donated in 1953 but could not be incorporated until the city could raise funds to buy the intervening ravine in 1973.

The park and environs were still rural when the park was established; further, most of the park is in a steep little canyon, so the park was spared all but minimal rural development as well as the surrounding boom of urban development.  The full old growth forest (1,000–2,000 years old) was all clearcut relatively early (around the early 20th century); the predominantly maple-alder successional stage forest is today mature.  Evergreens will gradually predominate.  Typical trees include deciduous maple, alder, ash, and willow, with madrona, cascere, and evergreen Western Red Cedar, Western Hemlock, Douglas fir, pine, and spruce.  Sedges, cattails, and other common indigenous flora fill out the understory and wetland areas, with particularly huge Lady Ferns along the ravine between 105th and 110th streets.

A chum salmon run on Pipers Creek was successfully restored in the late 20th Century. Peak season to see returning salmon is November.

Environmental Learning Center 

In addition to the variety of program activities and environmental stewardship, the community-driven Carkeek Park Environmental Learning Center (ELC) is becoming a model for resource efficiency and protection of human health and the environment.  Built to the highest standard of the U.S. Green Building Council, sustainable building features of the ELC include:
 rooftop rainwater harvest for flushing toilets and managing storm water.  This is becoming dramatically more attractive for large buildings and as potable water is becoming scarce (and expensive);
 energy-efficient highly insulated building envelope, intelligent lighting, and natural ventilation (some is rediscovery: natural lighting and ventilation were common before electricity);
 solar electric (photovoltaic) panels provided by City Light's Green Power program
 80% recycling or salvaging of demolition and construction waste;
 salmon-friendly landscaping, meaning drought-tolerant, native species and increased storm water infiltration;
 paints and coatings, adhesives, sealants, wood composites and carpeting which protect indoor air quality;
 recycled content products were used in construction: concrete, backfill, wood composite casework, insulation, and flooring; salvaged materials included peeler logs from a naval building in South Lake Union; and
 regional materials were preferred, supporting the regional economy and reducing the energy, waste, and pollution associated with transportation (one of the biggest components of fossil fuel and energy use).

Due to cuts to the City of Seattle's budget, the ELC closed in 2013.

Notes and references

See also
Daylighting (streams)
Vivian Carkeek
Water resources

Bibliography 
 
 This page has since been replaced by

Further reading 

 Seattle Parks and Recreation: Carkeek Park

Broadview, Seattle
Nature centers in Washington (state)
Parks in Seattle